The men's 200 metre freestyle competition at the 1995 Pan Pacific Swimming Championships took place on August 10 at the Georgia Tech Aquatic Center.  The last champion was Josh Davis of US.

This race consisted of four lengths of the pool, all in freestyle.

Records
Prior to this competition, the existing world and Pan Pacific records were as follows:

Results
All times are in minutes and seconds.

Heats
The first round was held on August 10.

B Final 
The B final was held on August 10.

A Final 
The A final was held on August 10.

References

1995 Pan Pacific Swimming Championships
Men's 200 metre freestyle